The Battle for the Old Mountain Jug was the name given to the Appalachian State–Western Carolina football rivalry, an American college football rivalry game that became dormant when Appalachian State left the Southern Conference and moved to the Football Bowl Subdivision in 2014.

History
The Mountaineers and Catamounts first played each other in a football game in 1932. The two teams then played annually without interruption from 1946 to 2013. The trophy series began in 1976.

The Old Mountain Jug, an old moonshine jug, has been awarded to the winner since 1976. It is painted gold with Appalachian State's mascot, a Mountaineer, and Western Carolina's mascot, a Catamount, on opposing sides.

Prior to the game in 1976, the idea was pitched of heightening the long-standing rivalry. The jug idea was presented to alumni of both universities and the Sports Information Directors were charged with drumming up media exposure. The jug was donated by Roby Triplett, the manager of the Appalachian State Bookstore. It weighs approximately 25 pounds and is capped with its original traditional cork. Dee Triplett, Roby's wife, painted the jug. Excluding minor touchups, the jug and its logos have not been altered since their creation.

In the mid-1980s, the series was mentioned as "the best football rivalry you've never heard of" by Sports Illustrated; but after 1985, the series became one-sided, with Western Carolina winning only 2 of the last 28 meetings. The 1979 game was the second-ever live broadcast on the ESPN sports network.

With Appalachian's move to the Sun Belt Conference of the Football Bowl Subdivision in 2014, the trophy was retired after 2013's contest. The Old Mountain Jug currently resides in a trophy case at Appalachian State.

Game results
The Appalachian State and Western Carolina rivalry dates back to 1932 with the Appalachian State Mountaineers holding a 59–18–1 advantage over the Western Carolina Catamounts. The two teams had squared off for 68 consecutive years since the game was suspended for World War II, 1942–1945.

See also
 List of NCAA college football rivalry games

References

College football rivalries in the United States
Appalachian State Mountaineers football
Western Carolina Catamounts football
1932 establishments in North Carolina